Vanishing Lessons is the fourth studio album by the American Christian metal band Tourniquet. It was originally released on Intense Records in 1994. It was the first Tourniquet album to feature then-lead vocalist Luke Easter, who joined the band in 1993. The songs "Bearing Gruesome Cargo," "Acid Head" and "K517" were included on the Tourniquet/Mortification Collector's Edition CD Single in 1994; the disc also featured tracks with Ted Kirkpatrick talking about Tourniquet and included material from the Australian Christian metal band Mortification's Live Planetarium and Blood World releases. A different version of "My Promise" was included on Tourniquet's extended play Carry the Wounded, and a music video for "Bearing Gruesome Cargo" was included on the band's VHS tape Pushin' Broom in 1995. This album was later bundled with 1992's Pathogenic Ocular Dissonance and released on KMG Records in 2000. Vanishing Lessons was independently re-released on Pathogenic Records with digital remastering, bonus tracks, and new artwork in 2004.

Track listing

1. Titled "Acidhead" on the remaster.

2. Excluded from the Brazilian remaster.

Personnel

Tourniquet
Luke Easter - vocals
Gary Lenaire - guitar
Victor Macias - bass
Ted Kirkpatrick - drums

2000 and 2002 live tracks
Ted Kirkpatrick - drums
Luke Easter - vocals
Aaron Guerra - guitars, vocals
Steve Andino - bass guitar

Additional personnel
Executive producer: Matthew Duffy
Produced by: Jim Faraci
Engineered by: Jim Faraci
Assistant engineer: Michael Steinbrech
Mixed by: Jim Faraci
Recorded and mixed at Rumbo Recorders in Canoga Park, California
Mastered by Chris Bellman at Bernie Grundman Mastering in Hollywood, California
Photography: Jim Muth
Art direction and design: Kristy Anderberg
Additional backing vocals: Lavant Coppic (“Drowning Machine”)
Additional guitar: M. Russo ("Drowning Machine," "Vanishing Lessons," "Twilight" and "Sola Christus")

References

External links
Vanishing Lessons (1994) at Tourniquet.net
Vanishing Lessons (2004) at Tourniquet.net

1994 albums
Tourniquet (band) albums